The 2005 Liga Indonesia Premier Division Final was a football match which was played on 25 September 2005 at Gelora Bung Karno Stadium in Jakarta. It was contested by Persija Jakarta and Persipura Jayapura to determine the winner of the 2005 Liga Indonesia Premier Division. Persipura won the match 3–2 after 120 minutes to claim their first-ever professional title.

Road to the final

Match details

References

External links
Liga Indonesia Premier Division standings

2005